Formed in Melbourne, Australia in 1915, the Women’s Peace Army was an Australian anti-war socialist movement that sought to mobilise and unite women, regardless of political or religious beliefs, in their opposition to war. Autonomous branches of the Women’s Peace Army were also established in the Australian cities of Sydney and Brisbane.

Formation and aims 

The Women's Peace Army was formed in Melbourne, Victoria, Australia on 8 July 1915 during a meeting of the Women’s Political Association presided by Vida Goldstein, a noted suffragist and pacifist.  The Women's Peace Army's motto was "We war against war" and their flag utilised the colours of the suffragette movement - purple (dignity), green (hope) and white (purity).

The movement opposed war and by association conscription, proclaiming that governments should seek a mandate from the people, such as a referendum, before entering into a war.

The movement actively held regular public meetings to recruit new members. Other activities included staging peace demonstrations and petitioning members of parliament.

New members were required to sign a pledge dedicating themselves to the principles of the Women's Peace Army -  "I believe that war is a degradation of motherhood, an economic futility, and a crime against civilisation and humanity. I therefore, pledge myself to active service in the cause of peace by working against compulsory military training and every form of militarism. Further, I solemnly pledge myself to face uninchingly adverse criticism, calumny, and persecution for my faith that LOVE and JUSTICE alone will bring peace to the world." (Membership booklet for the Women's Peace Army, Queensland branch)

Queensland branch 
The Queensland branch of the Women's Peace Army was established at a meeting in Brisbane on 16 November 1915. The meeting was attended by Melbourne delegates Adela Pankhurst and Cecilia John, who both gave speeches. Clio Jensen was later elected president of the Queensland branch, with Margaret Thorp as secretary/treasurer and seasoned suffragist Emma Miller sharing the position of vice-president with Mabel Lane. A later advert (above) described Parkhurst as "Organiser".

During one meeting at Brisbane's Centennial Hall, army authorities notified the organisers that they would arrest anyone who sang the anti-war song "I Didn't Raise My Son to Be a Soldier", an offence under the War Precautions Act. In defiance, copies of the song sheet were distributed at the meeting with the audience singing the banned song in unity. No arrests were made.

References

Further reading 
 Women's Peace Army membership booklet, ca.1915. State Library of Queensland collection

Peace organisations based in Australia
Women's organisations based in Australia
Queensland in World War I
1910s in Queensland
20th century in Melbourne
1910s in Melbourne